State Route 44 (SR-44) is a state highway in the U.S. state of Utah that runs from US-191 at Greendale Junction, southwest of Dutch John, to SR-43 in Manila. The route spans  as it straddles the southern and western border of the Flaming Gorge National Recreation Area, and, along with US-191 is part of the Flaming Gorge-Uintas Scenic Byway.

The highway was established in 1927, originally going from Manila to Greendale Junction and continuing south to Vernal. However, in 1981, the portion from Vernal to Greendale Junction was truncated in order to designate that road a part of US-191.

Route description
The route begins at the junction of US-191 on the southern boundary of the Flaming Gorge National Recreation Area, southwest of Dutch John. From there, the route heads west, continuing to straddle the southern boundary of Flaming Gorge. The highway turns northwest, now fully entering the National Recreation Area. Past Sheep Creek Loop Road, the route begins a more unpredictable path with many twists and turns, though remaining in a general northwest direction. The route continues north, exits Flaming Gorge, and continues north for  before terminating at SR-43 in Manila.

History
The road from SR-6 (US-40) in Vernal north to SR-43 in Manila, where one could continue to Wyoming, was added to the state highway system in about 1918 as a forest highway project, completed in 1926, and numbered SR-44 in 1927. Two major realignments through the Ashley National Forest were made in 1966 and 1971, the first moving SR-44 to the northeast between a point south of Carter Creek and near Summit Springs, and the second moving it east between a point east of Summit Springs and Sheep Creek Gap. (The east–west road past Summit Springs was only a state highway between 1966 and 1971.) The final change was in 1981, when the part of SR-44 south of Greendale Junction was renumbered as part of US-191.

Major intersections

See also

 List of state highways in Utah

References

External links

044
044
 044